Starfall may refer to:

 Starfall (album), by Dragonland, 2004
 Starfall (board game), from Yaquinto, 1979
 Starfall (Star Wars: The Roleplaying Game), published by West End Games in 1989
 Starfall (website), a website that teaches children how to read and write
 Starfall (film), a 1981 Soviet film
 "Starfall", a 2009 novella in the Xeelee Sequence by Stephen Baxter

See also
 Star Falls, an American comedy television series